A House of Sand is a 1962 film.

See also
 List of American films of 1962

References

External links

1962 films
1962 drama films
American drama films
1960s English-language films
1960s American films